Dumsiai Forest is a forest in Jonava District Municipality, central Lithuania. It covers area in Šveicarija Eldership. River Taurosta goes through the forest.

Public attractions 
The forest is the place for public hiking routes and rest areas. The longest hike route called Takas is the length of 1300 m.

Dumsiai Forest is also a location for abandoned military base.

References

Forests of Lithuania
Jonava District Municipality